Elisabet Ehrnrooth (born 2 May 1967) is a Finnish equestrian. She competed in the individual dressage event at the 2000 Summer Olympics.

References

External links
 

1967 births
Living people
Finnish female equestrians
Finnish dressage riders
Olympic equestrians of Finland
Equestrians at the 2000 Summer Olympics
People from Nyköping Municipality